The Malaysia men's national under-18 ice hockey team is the men's national under-18 ice hockey team of Malaysia. The team is controlled by the Malaysia Ice Hockey Federation, a member of the International Ice Hockey Federation.

History
The Malaysia men's national under-18 ice hockey team played its first game in 2012 during the 2012 IIHF U18 Challenge Cup of Asia being held in Abu Dhabi, United Arab Emirates. Malaysia finished third after winning their games against Hong Kong and India but losing to Thailand and the United Arab Emirates. Their opening game of the tournament was against Thailand which they lost 1–19 was recorded as their largest ever loss in international competition.

Roster
From the 2012 IIHF U18 Challenge Cup of Asia

International competitions
2012 IIHF U18 Challenge Cup of Asia. Finish: 3rd

References

Ice hockey in Malaysia
National under-18 ice hockey teams
Ice hockey